Flourensia is a genus of flowering plants in the family Asteraceae. It contains subshrubs and shrubs, which are commonly known as tarworts. They are found in the southwestern United States, Mexico, Central America, and South America. The genus name honours French physiologist Jean Pierre Flourens (1794–1867).

 Species
 Flourensia angustifolia (DC.) S.F.Blake- Peru
 Flourensia blakeana M.O.Dillon	- Argentina (Tucuman, Catamarca)
 Flourensia cajabambensis M.O.Dillon - Peru
 Flourensia campestris Griseb. - Argentina (La Rioja, San Juan, Santiago del Estero, Catamarca)
 Flourensia cernua DC. – American tarwort, tarbush - Chihuahua, Coahuila, USA (Texas New Mexico Arizona)
 Flourensia collodes (Greenm.) S.F.Blake- Chiapas, Oaxaca
 Flourensia dentata S.F.Blake - Zacatecas
 Flourensia fiebrigii S.F.Blake	- Argentina, Bolivia
 Flourensia glutinosa (B.L.Rob. & Greenm.) S.F.Blake - Oaxaca, Puebla
 Flourensia heterolepis S.F.Blake - Bolivia (Cochabamba, Santa Cruz), Peru (Cusco)
 Flourensia hirta S.F.Blake- Argentina (La Rioja, Catamarca)
 Flourensia hirtissima S.F.Blake- Argentina (Río Negro)
 Flourensia ilicifolia Brandegee- Coahuila
 Flourensia laurifolia DC. - San Luis Potosí, Tamaulipas, Hidalgo
 Flourensia leptopoda S.F.Blake	- Argentina (La Rioja, San Juan)
 Flourensia macroligulata Seeligm.- Argentina (Jujuy, Tucuman)
 Flourensia macrophylla (A.Gray) S.F.Blake - Peru
 Flourensia monticola  M.O. Dillon - Coahuila, Nuevo León
 Flourensia niederleinii S.F.Blake- Argentina (La Rioja)
 Flourensia oolepis S.F.Blake- Argentina (Catamarca, Córdoba, San Luis)
 Flourensia peruviana M.O.Dillon- Peru (Ayacucho, Huancavelica)
 Flourensia polycephala M.O.Dillon - Peru (Apurímac, Cusco)
 Flourensia polyclada S.F.Blake - Argentina 
 Flourensia pringlei (A.Gray) S.F.Blake - Chihuahua, Durango, New Mexico (Hidalgo County)
 Flourensia pulcherrima M.O.Dillon- Durango
 Flourensia resinosa (Brandegee) S.F.Blake- Hidalgo, Querétaro
 Flourensia retinophylla S.F.Blake- Coahuila
 Flourensia riparia Griseb. - Argentina (Jujuy, Salta, Catamarca, Tucuman)
 Flourensia solitaria S.F.Blake	- Coahuila
 Flourensia suffrutescens (R.E.Fr.) S.F.Blake - Argentina (Jujuy, Salta)
 Flourensia thurifera (Molina) DC. - Chile (Coquimbo, Santiago, Valparaíso)
 Flourensia tortuosa Griseb. - Argentina (Salta, Catamarca, Tucuman)

References

External links

Heliantheae
Asteraceae genera